The 1824 Rhode Island gubernatorial election was an election held on April 21, 1824 to elect the Governor of Rhode Island. James Fenner, the Jackson Republican nominee, beat Wheeler Marion, the Democratic Republican candidate, with 78.05% of the vote.

General election

Candidates
James Fenner, Governor of Rhode Island 1807-1811.
Wheeler Marion, Democratic-Republican candidate.

Results

References

Rhode Island gubernatorial elections
1824 Rhode Island elections
Rhode Island
April 1824 events